The Ig Nobel Prize is a satiric prize awarded annually since 1991 to celebrate ten unusual or trivial achievements in scientific research. Its aim is to "honor achievements that first make people laugh, and then make them think." The name of the award is a pun on the Nobel Prize, which it parodies, and on the word ignoble ("not noble").

Organized by the scientific humor magazine, Annals of Improbable Research (AIR), the Ig Nobel Prizes are presented by Nobel laureates in a ceremony at the Sanders Theater, Harvard University, and are followed by the winners' public lectures at the Massachusetts Institute of Technology.

History 
The Ig Nobels were created in 1991 by Marc Abrahams, editor and co-founder of the Annals of Improbable Research, a former editor-in-chief of the Journal of Irreproducible Results who has been master of ceremonies at all awards ceremonies. Awards were presented at that time for discoveries "that cannot, or should not, be reproduced". Ten prizes are awarded each year in many categories, including the Nobel Prize categories of physics, chemistry, physiology/medicine, literature, and peace, but also other categories such as public health, engineering, biology, and interdisciplinary research. The Ig Nobel Prizes recognize genuine achievements, with the exception of three prizes awarded in the first year to fictitious scientists Josiah S. Carberry, Paul DeFanti, and Thomas Kyle.

The awards are sometimes criticism via satire, as in the two awards given for homeopathy research, prizes in "science education" to the Kansas State Department of Education and Colorado State Board of Education for their stance regarding the teaching of evolution, and the prize awarded to Social Text after the Sokal affair. Most often, however, they draw attention to scientific articles that have some humorous or unexpected aspect. Examples range from the discovery that the presence of humans tends to sexually arouse ostriches, to the statement that black holes fulfill all the technical requirements for being the location of Hell, to research on the "five-second rule", a tongue-in-cheek belief that food dropped on the floor will not become contaminated if it is picked up within five seconds.

Sir Andre Geim, who had been awarded an Ig Nobel Prize in 2000 for levitating a frog by magnetism, was awarded a Nobel Prize in physics in 2010 for his work with the electromagnetic properties of graphene.  He is the only individual, as of 2021, to have received both a Nobel and an Ig Nobel.

Ceremony 
The prizes are mostly presented by Nobel laureates, originally at a ceremony in a lecture hall at MIT but since 1994 in the Sanders Theater at Harvard University. Due to the COVID-19 pandemic, 2020 and 2021's event was held fully online. The event contains a number of running jokes, including Miss Sweetie Poo, a little girl who repeatedly cries out, "Please stop: I'm bored", in a high-pitched voice if speakers go on too long. The awards ceremony is traditionally closed with the words: "If you didn't win a prize—and especially if you did—better luck next year!"

The ceremony is co-sponsored by the Harvard Computer Society, the Harvard–Radcliffe Science Fiction Association and the Harvard–Radcliffe Society of Physics Students.

Throwing paper planes onto the stage is a long-standing tradition. For many years Professor Roy J. Glauber swept the stage clean of the airplanes as the official "Keeper of the Broom". Glauber could not attend the 2005 awards because he was traveling to Stockholm to claim a genuine Nobel Prize in Physics.

The "Parade of Ignitaries" into the hall includes supporting groups. At the 1997 ceremonies, a team of "cryogenic sex researchers" distributed a pamphlet titled "Safe Sex at Four Kelvin." Delegates from the Museum of Bad Art are often on hand to display some pieces from their collection.

Outreach 
The ceremony is recorded and broadcast on National Public Radio in the US and is shown live over the Internet. The recording is broadcast each year, on the Friday after US Thanksgiving, on the public radio program Science Friday. In recognition of this, the audience chants the name of the radio show's host, Ira Flatow.

Two books have been published with write-ups on some winners: The Ig Nobel Prize, and The Ig Nobel Prize 2 which was later retitled The Man Who Tried to Clone Himself.

An Ig Nobel Tour has been an annual part of National Science week in the United Kingdom since 2003. The tour has also traveled to Australia several times, Aarhus University in Denmark in April 2009, Italy and The Netherlands.

Reception 
A September 2009 article in The National titled "A noble side to Ig Nobels" says that, although the Ig Nobel Awards are veiled criticism of trivial research, history shows that trivial research sometimes leads to important breakthroughs. For instance, in 2006, a study showing that one of the malaria mosquitoes (Anopheles gambiae) is attracted equally to the smell of Limburger cheese and the smell of human feet earned the Ig Nobel Prize in the area of biology. As a direct result of these findings, traps baited with this cheese have been placed in strategic locations in some parts of Africa to combat the epidemic of malaria. And Andre Geim, before sharing the 2010 Nobel Prize in Physics for his research on graphene, shared the Physics Ig Nobel in 2000 with Michael Berry for the magnetic levitation of a frog, which by 2022 was reportedly part of the inspiration for China's lunar gravity research facility.

See also 
 List of Ig Nobel Prize winners
 Darwin Awards – an award for enriching the human gene pool by idiotic self-destruction
 Golden Raspberry Awards – awards for bad movies
 Bulwer-Lytton Fiction Contest – an award for bad writing
 Bookseller/Diagram Prize for Oddest Title of the Year – a book prize
 Pigasus Award – exposing parapsychological, paranormal, or psychic frauds
 Golden Fleece Award – award for waste of government funds; often awarded for government-paid research considered frivolous or wasteful
 Foot in Mouth Award – an award presented by the Plain English Campaign for "a baffling comment by a public figure"
 "British scientists" – Russian joke regarding absurd news reports about scientific discoveries

References

External links 

 
 Index to list of past winners
 

 
1991 establishments in the United States
Awards established in 1991
Harvard University
Ironic and humorous awards
Humour in science